Balbaroo is an extinct genus of quadrupedal kangaroo that once lived in Australia.

Taxonomy
The genus was erected in 1983 to describe a new species of early marsupials, Balbaroo camfieldensis. Since then, it has been determined that members of the genus possessed sharp canines, and they are thought to have been carnivores.

Four species are currently recognised:
 Balbaroo camfieldensis Flannery, Archer and Plane, 1983
 Balbaroo fangaroo  Cooke, 2000 
 Balbaroo gregoriensis Flannery, Archer and Plane, 1983
 Balbaroo nalima Black et al, 2014

References 

Marsupials of Australia
Prehistoric macropods
Fossil taxa described in 1983